Dy Nobel Ritchy Boungou Colo (born April 26, 1988) is a Congolese-French professional basketball player for Antibes Sharks of LNB Pro B. He also represented the France national basketball team internationally.

Professional career
On February 18, 2018, Boungou Colo went to win the 2018 edition of the Italian Basketball Cup with Fiat Torino by beating Germani Basket Brescia 69–67 in the Finals.

On October 2, 2021, he has signed with Metropolitans 92 of the LNB Pro A.

Career statistics

EuroLeague

|-
| style="text-align:left;"| 2014–15
| style="text-align:left;" rowspan=2| Limoges
| 10 || 10 || 27.9 || .385 || .237 || .793 || 2.8 || 2.2 || 1.1 || .2  || 10.2 || 8.8
|-
| style="text-align:left;"| 2015–16
| 10 || 9 || 27.1 || .390 || .389 || .857 || 3.1 || 3.0 || 1.2 || .4  || 8.6 || 11.1
|- class="sortbottom"
| style="text-align:center;" colspan=2 | Career
| 20 || 19 || 27.5 || .387 || .311 || .814 || 3.0 || 2.6 || 1.1 || .3  || 9.4 || 10.0

References

External links
 Nobel Boungou Colo at eurobasket.com
 Nobel Boungou Colo at euroleague.net
 

1988 births
Living people
Auxilium Pallacanestro Torino players
BC Khimki players
Black French sportspeople
French expatriate basketball people in Italy
French expatriate basketball people in Spain
French expatriate basketball people in Russia
French men's basketball players
French sportspeople of Republic of the Congo descent
HTV Basket players
Joventut Badalona players
Le Mans Sarthe Basket players
Liga ACB players
Limoges CSP players
Orléans Loiret Basket players
Power forwards (basketball)
Real Betis Baloncesto players
Paris Basketball players
Republic of the Congo men's basketball players
Small forwards
Sportspeople from Brazzaville